Hippeastrum leopoldii is a flowering perennial herbaceous bulbous plant, in the family Amaryllidaceae, distributed from Peru to Bolivia.

Taxonomy 
Described by Thomas Moore in 1870.

Etymology 
Named in honour of King Leopold II of Belgium, upon his visit to the Royal Horticultural Society exhibition in South Kensington in 1870 .

Cultivation 
H. leopoldii has played an important part in Hippeastrum breeding programmes, resulting in the so-called Leopoldii hybrids, the most important of which was 'John Heal'.

References

Sources 
 
 GBIF: Hippeastrum leopoldii
 Read, V.M. (2004). Hippeastrum the gardener's amaryllis: 1–296. Timber Press, Portland, Cambridge. 
 International Bulb Society: Hippeastrum leopoldii (image)
 Tropicos: Hippeastrum leopoldii

Flora of South America
leopoldii
Garden plants of South America
Plants described in 1870